Chuni is a rural locality (a selo) in Levashinsky District, Republic of Dagestan, Russia. The population was 881 as of 2010. There are 6 streets.

Geography 
Chuni is located 14 km south of Levashi (the district's administrative centre) by road. Chognimakhi and Kuknamakhi are the nearest rural localities.

Nationalities 
Avars live there.

References 

Rural localities in Levashinsky District